Menaquinol oxidase (H+-transporting) (cytochrome aa3-600 oxidase) is an enzyme with systematic name menaquinol:O2 oxidoreductase (H+-transporting). This enzyme catalyses the following chemical reaction

 2 menaquinol + O2  2 menaquinone + 2 H2O

Cytochrome aa3-600, one of the respiratory oxidases from Bacillus subtilis, is a member of the heme-copper family of oxygen reductases.

References

External links 
 

EC 1.10.3